Sir Augustus Gordon Grant-Asher  (18 December 1861 – 15 June 1930) was a Scotland international rugby union player. He also represented Scotland as a cricket player.

Rugby Union career

Amateur career

Grant-Asher went to Loretto School, and went up to Brasenose College, Oxford after that.

He played for Oxford University RFC, as well as the Fettesian-Lorettonian Club, and Edinburgh Wanderers.

Provincial career

He was capped by Edinburgh District for the inter-city match in 1885 while with Edinburgh Wanderers.

He was capped by East of Scotland District for their match against West of Scotland District. This was at the end of January 1886; and he was now with Fettesian-Lorettonians.

International career

He played at half back.

R.J. Phillips, the first historian of Scottish rugby said:
"no one has arisen to bear comparison with A.R. Don Wauchope at quarter or half back, where he and A.G.G. Asher still hold claim as the greatest pair to have played together for their country."

Administrative career

He was president of the Scottish Rugby Union from 1929 to 1930.

Cricket career

At Oxford, he played in 10 first-class cricket matches for the Oxford University team in 1883 and 1884, winning a Blue for cricket in 1883. He also played for the Scotland national cricket team.

Other sports

Grant-Asher was also Scotland's pole vault champion.

Law career

In later life he was a Writer to the Signet.

Honours

He was appointed CBE in the 1918 Birthday Honours and knighted in the 1927 Birthday Honours.

Death

He is buried in the churchyard of Insh Church, Kincraig, near Kingussie, Highland.

See also
 List of Scottish cricket and rugby union players

References

Sources

 Bath, Richard (ed.) The Scotland Rugby Miscellany (Vision Sports Publishing Ltd, 2007 )
 Godwin, Terry Complete Who's Who of International Rugby (Cassell, 1987)
 Massie, Allan A Portrait of Scottish Rugby (Polygon, Edinburgh)

1861 births
1930 deaths
Alumni of Brasenose College, Oxford
Commanders of the Order of the British Empire
East of Scotland District players
Edinburgh District (rugby union) players
Edinburgh Wanderers RFC players
Fettesian-Lorretonian rugby union players
History of rugby union in Scotland
Indian rugby union players
Knights Bachelor
Oxford University cricketers
Oxford University RFC players
People educated at Loretto School, Musselburgh
Presidents of the Scottish Rugby Union
Rugby players from Maharashtra
Rugby union officials
Scotland international rugby union players
Scottish cricketers
Scottish rugby union players
Scottish solicitors
Sportspeople from Pune